is a brand name for artificial leather manufactured by Kuraray Co., Ltd. of Japan. It is commonly used in gloves, footwear, handbags, and law enforcement duty gear. Versions are made that simulate suede and top-grain leather.

Being a man-made material, it is washable and retains its softness when wet, unlike natural leather.  After many decades of development, Clarino has achieved performance that exceeds that of leather in some applications, especially where the item may be exposed to water, such as riding saddles. Top grain leather applications include "patent leather" shoes that retain high gloss without the need for polish. During manufacturing, it is microscopically perforated to give it breathability similar to that of natural leather. Clarino is based on a non-woven fabric composed of special synthetic fibers that are intertwined three-dimensionally. The material's softness and suppleness arise from the structure of the non-woven fabric's special fibers, superfine fiber construction and tiny cavities.

Clarino is made from blended nylon and polypropylene fibers, as well as a sponge-like polyurethane binder. Firstly, the nylon and polypropylene fibers are blended using a blend-spinning technique. The blended fiber is then shredded into fine pieces and filtered. After this, the nylon is eluted and coagulated. The fibers absorb polyurethane and coagulate in water. This allows the nonwoven fabric and sponge-like binder to form around the same time. This process was developed in 1964.

References

Artificial leather
Japanese brands
Kuraray